Gergeti ( also known as Ortsveri) is a glacier located on the southeastern slope of Mt. Kazbek in the Kazbegi District of Georgia. Most of the glacier is located within an old and eroded volcanic caldera, where, at the edge of the caldera's northern rim, rises the cone of Mt. Kazbek. The southern rim of the caldera  where the glacier descends, is bounded by Mount Ortsveri.

See also
Glaciers of Georgia

References 
 Georgian State (Soviet) Encyclopedia. 1978. Book 3. p. 99.

Glaciers of Georgia (country)